Rick Geenen (born August 13, 1988) is a Dutch footballer who currently plays for EVV in the Dutch Topklasse. He formerly played for Fortuna Sittard, Hansa Rostock and MVV Maastricht.

External links

1988 births
Living people
Dutch footballers
Dutch expatriate footballers
Eerste Divisie players
Derde Divisie players
Fortuna Sittard players
FC Hansa Rostock players
MVV Maastricht players
Expatriate footballers in Germany
People from Geleen
3. Liga players
RKVV EVV players
Association football central defenders
Footballers from Limburg (Netherlands)
Dutch expatriate sportspeople in Germany